Mark William Hager (born 28 April 1964) is a retired Australian field hockey player, who competed in two Summer Olympics for his native country. After the fourth place in 1988 he won the bronze medal with The Kookaburras at the 1996 Summer Olympics in Atlanta, Georgia where he was the captain.

Coaching career
Following his playing career, Hager has been pursuing a coaching career in the sport. His achievements as a coach include:

 2018 Commonwealth Games - Head Coach, New Zealand Women (Gold)
 2008 Beijing Olympics – Asst Coach, Australian Men (Bronze)
 2009 8 Nations – Head Coach, Australian U21 Men (Gold)
 2007 Youth Olympics – Head Coach, Australia (Gold)
 2005–07 Australian Institute Team – Head Coach
 2005 U21 World Cup – Head Coach, Australia (Silver)
 2004 Athens Olympics – Asst Coach, Australian Women (5th)
 2003 Champions Trophy – Asst Coach, Australian Women (Gold)
 2002 World Cup – Asst Coach, Australian Women (4th)
 2002 Champions Trophy – Asst Coach, Australian Women (4th)
 2001 Champions Trophy – Asst Coach, Australian Women (Bronze)
 2001 U21 World Cup – Head Coach, Australian Women (Bronze)
 1998-0 AHL – Head Coach, WA Thundersticks (2 x Golds)

In December 2008, Hager was appointed the coach of the New Zealand women's national field hockey team (the Black Sticks Women). Besides this he is also the head coach of Kalinga Lancers which plays in the Hockey India League(HIL)

On 11 January 2019 Hager was appointed Head Coach of England & Great Britain women's national field hockey team

Personal life
His wife Michelle Capes, sister-in-law Lee Capes, brother-in-law Michael Nobbs and niece Kaitlin Nobbs have all represented Australia at field hockey at the Olympic Games.

References

External links
 
Australian Olympic Committee
Mark Hager

1964 births
Australian male field hockey players
Olympic field hockey players of Australia
Olympic bronze medalists for Australia
Field hockey players at the 1988 Summer Olympics
Field hockey players at the 1996 Summer Olympics
Living people
People from Maryborough, Queensland
Olympic medalists in field hockey
Medalists at the 1996 Summer Olympics
New Zealand Olympic coaches
New Zealand women's national field hockey team coaches
Sportsmen from Queensland
University of Western Australia alumni
Coaches at the 2012 Summer Olympics
Coaches at the 2016 Summer Olympics
Coaches at the 2020 Summer Olympics
British Olympic coaches
Australian expatriate sportspeople in England
Australian expatriate sportspeople in New Zealand
Australian expatriate sportspeople in India
Field hockey people from Queensland